Burdwan Municipal High School, located at the heart of Burdwan, a town 95 km north-west of Kolkata,  is one of the oldest boys' schools in India. The school was established in 1883 by Maharshi Debendranath Tagore, along with Adi Brahmo Samaj as Brahmo Samaj Boys’ School.

History
In 1855 Maharshi Debendranath Tagore, along with Adi Brahmo Samaj established Brahmo Samaj Boys’ School (later renamed Burdwan English School). Bhagaban Chandra Basu, the then Deputy magistrate of Burdwan and father of Sir Jagadish Chandra Bose, was one of its founders. After the demise of Mahatab Chandra the Brahma movement in Burdwan became weak for lack of patronage and the school became in financial straits. Burdwan Municipality took over the school and Burdwan Municipal High School started its journey anew in 1883.

Curriculum
 

This school is a higher secondary school (from class 1 to 12).

The curriculum is as per West Bengal Board of Secondary Education (until class 10) and West Bengal Council of Higher Secondary Education (Class 11 and 12).

The common curriculum is followed until class 10. In class 11 and 12, there are 3 streams: Science, Commerce and Arts.

Achievements
The school has a good reputation for its remarkable result in Madhyamik Examination as well as Higher Secondary Examination. Students of this school have secured multiple ranks both in examinations.

References

External links
Official website
Alumni Association website
Burdwan Municipal High School unofficial facebook page

Boys' schools in India
Primary schools in West Bengal
High schools and secondary schools in West Bengal
Schools in Bardhaman
Educational institutions established in 1883
1883 establishments in India